Hodgman or Hodgeman is a surname. Notable people with the surname include:

Bill Hodgman, Australian politician
Helen Hodgman (1945–2022), Australian novelist
John Hodgman, American humorist
Kym Hodgeman, Australian footballer
Michael Hodgman, Australian politician
Peter Hodgman, Australian politician
Roger Hodgman, Australian director
William A. Hodgman, Governor of Guam
William Hodgman, lawyer and prosecutor, known for his work in the O. J. Simpson murder case
William Edward Felix Hodgman, Australian politician

See also
Hodgeman County, Kansas